Gramella salexigens is a Gram-negative, aerobic and non-spore-forming bacterium from the genus of Gramella which has been isolated from water from Hwajinpo in Korea.

References

Flavobacteria
Bacteria described in 2018